Sir James Brown Patterson  (18 November 1833 – 30 October 1895), was an Australian politician who served as premier of Victoria from 1893 to 1894.

Patterson was born in 1833 at Patterson Cottage, Alnwick, Northumberland, England to James Patterson, contractor, and Agnes, née Brown. Patterson emigrated to Victoria in 1852 to seek his fortune on the goldfields. After a few years as a digger and four as a farmer, he settled in Chewton, where he went into business as a butcher, later moving into real estate. He was Mayor of Chewton for four years before he was elected to the Victorian Legislative Assembly for Castlemaine in 1870.

A moderate conservative, Patterson served in the second third governments of the liberal leader Graham Berry, as commissioner for public works in August 1875 and as commissioner for public works and vice-president of the board of land and works in 1877–1880. From July 1878 to March 1880 he was also Postmaster-General. After 1881 he went into opposition, under the leadership of Duncan Gillies, and was commissioner for trade and customs in the Gillies government from 1889 to 1890.

With the onset of the depression which followed the end of the Land Boom in 1891, Patterson emerged as the leader of the conservative critics of the governments of James Munro and William Shiels, who tried to deal with the crash by cutting government expenditure and raising taxes. Patterson spoke for the business and middle classes who did not want increased taxation at a time of depressed trade. In January 1893 Patterson moved a successful no-confidence motion in the Shiels government and became Premier.

Patterson's government, however, had no better solutions to the depressed state of Victoria's government. A series of bank failures in April lead Patterson to declare a "bank holiday" (1 May 1893 – 5 May 1893) preventing panicked depositors from withdrawing their money. There were near-riots outside the closed banks, and confidence in the colony's finances plummeted. Later in the year Patterson became convinced that tax increases were after all inevitable, which the liberal opposition supported, but his conservative supporters revolted and he withdrew the idea, leaving himself with no policy at all.

Affairs drifted until August 1894, when Patterson in turn lost a confidence vote in the Assembly. At the resulting elections the conservatives were heavily defeated by the protectionists under George Turner. Patterson returned to the opposition benches and was created K.C.M.G. in 1894. He was still a member of Parliament when he died on 30 October 1895 from influenza in Murrumbeena, Victoria.

An 1893 portrait of Patterson by Gordon Coutts hangs in the Victorian Parliament House.

Although the surname was common in the region at the time, he is thought to be the namesake for Patterson Lakes and river, Patterson Road and locale, and the subsequently-named railway station after Bentleigh on the Frankston railway line.

References

Geoff Browne, A Biographical Register of the Victorian Parliament, 1900–84, Government Printer, Melbourne, 1985
Don Garden, Victoria: A History, Thomas Nelson, Melbourne, 1984
Kathleen Thompson and Geoffrey Serle, A Biographical Register of the Victorian Parliament, 1856–1900, Australian National University Press, Canberra, 1972
 Raymond Wright, A People's Counsel. A History of the Parliament of Victoria, 1856–1990, Oxford University Press, Melbourne, 1992

1833 births
1895 deaths
Premiers of Victoria
Members of the Victorian Legislative Assembly
Australian federationists
Australian Knights Commander of the Order of St Michael and St George
People from Alnwick
English emigrants to colonial Australia
19th-century Australian politicians
Australian real estate businesspeople
19th-century Australian businesspeople
Deaths from influenza